Marko Pridigar (born 18 May 1985) is a retired Slovenian footballer goalkeeper.

Club career
Pridigar started his career in the youth squads of Maribor where he also signed his first professional contract. He made his debut in the Slovenian PrvaLiga at the age of 20 in a game against Nafta Lendava. During his first years as a professional he was competing for the place in the first team with another goalkeeper Marko Ranilović. He was the first choice goalkeeper during the 2007–08 and 2008–09 seasons as he played most of the league matches at that time. In the next season (2009–10) he lost his place in the starting eleven to Ranilović and played a total of eleven matches in the first league. During this period he was also injured for couple of months.

He was the first choice goalkeeper in Maribor at the start of the 2010–11 season and his performances has been impressive. However, he suffered another injury halfway through the first part of the season and was again sidelined. At the beginning of the second part of the season Pridigar was unfortunate again, when he was on goal during his first league appearance after the injury in the first part. During a match against Olimpija he made a save, but an opponent player stepped on his hand in the process, which fractured a bone in his palm on three different places. Pridigar was operated on 17 March 2011, and was sidelined for the rest of the season.

References

External links
PrvaLiga profile 

1985 births
Living people
Sportspeople from Maribor
Slovenian footballers
Association football goalkeepers
Slovenian PrvaLiga players
Slovenian Second League players
Cypriot First Division players
Marko Pridigar
NK Maribor players
NK Aluminij players
NK Zavrč players
Ayia Napa FC players
Marko Pridigar
NK Rudar Velenje players
Slovenian expatriate footballers
Slovenian expatriate sportspeople in Cyprus
Expatriate footballers in Cyprus
Slovenian expatriate sportspeople in Iceland
Expatriate footballers in Iceland
Slovenia youth international footballers
Slovenia under-21 international footballers